The 1983 Nations motorcycle Grand Prix was the third race of the 1983 Grand Prix motorcycle racing season. It took place on the weekend of 22–24 April 1983 at the Autodromo Nazionale Monza.

Classification

500 cc

References

Italian motorcycle Grand Prix
Nations
Nations